Diamonds On the Inside is the fifth album by American singer-songwriter Ben Harper, released in 2003. Although he did not explicitly credit the Innocent Criminals for the first time in 10 years, all the touring members continue to support him on the album. On this album, Harper brought on several new additions to his band, the first being guitarist Nicky Panicci (a.k.a. Nicky P)  in 2002 who is the first guitar player to be credited on a Ben Harper record. Panicci toured with Harper on the Diamonds on the Inside Tour for almost a year. After leaving Harper's band on his own accord,  Marc Ford, formerly of The Black Crowes replaced Panicci and joined Harper's band.

Track listing
All songs written by Ben Harper except as noted.
"With My Own Two Hands" – 4:35
"When It's Good" – 3:03
"Diamonds On the Inside" – 4:27
"Touch from Your Lust" – 4:28
"When She Believes" – 5:20
"Brown Eyed Blues" (Harper, Nelson) – 5:42
"Bring the Funk" (Charles, Harper, Kurstin, Mobley, Nelson) – 4:07
"Everything" – 3:04
"Amen Omen" – 5:51
"Temporary Remedy" – 3:11
"So High So Low" – 3:44
"Blessed to Be a Witness" – 4:11
"Picture of Jesus" – 5:49
"She's Only Happy in the Sun" (Dean Butterworth, Harper) – 3:57

Personnel
Ben Harper – organ, acoustic guitar, bass,  drums, electric guitar, vocals, synthesiser bass, tongue drum
Al Yasha Anderson – guitar solo on "With My Own Two Hands"
Carla Benson – background vocals
Ron Blake – trumpet
Leo Chelyapov – clarinet
John Ingram – background vocals
Greg Kurstin – synthesizer, piano, celeste, Hammond organ, electric piano, background vocals, clavinet, mellotron
Ladysmith Black Mambazo – vocals
Greg Leisz – pedal steel
Timothy Loo – cello
Misty Love – background vocals
Leon Mobley – percussion, sound effects, background vocals
Juan Nelson – bass, background vocals
Nicky Panicci (a.k.a. Nicky P.) – acoustic guitar, guitar, electric guitar
David Ralicke – trombone
Darrel Sims – viola
Amy Wilkins – harp
Rebecca Yeh – cello
Josef Zimmerman – upright bass

Production
Producer: Ben Harper
Engineers: Todd Burke, Rick "Soldier" Will
Assistant engineers: Kevin Dean, June Murakawa
Mixing: Todd Burke
Mastering: Gavin Lurssen
Arrangers: Ben Harper, Greg Kurstin
Assistants: Josh Florian, Rail Jon Rogut
Advisor: Ben Elder
Design: Mike King
Layout Design: Mike King
Photography: Warren Darius Aftahi, Blue Sky, Jon Shapiro
Research: Ben Elder

Charts

Weekly charts

Year-end charts

Singles – Billboard (North America)

Certifications

References

Ben Harper albums
2003 albums
Virgin Records albums